The Shantou Bay Bridge is a suspension bridge located in Shantou, Guangdong Province, China. It is nicknamed "The Goddess of Bridges". The bridge carries the G15 Shenyang–Haikou Expressway.

See also 
List of longest suspension bridge spans
Mayu Island
Queshi Bridge

External links

 

Bridges in Guangdong
Suspension bridges in China
Bridges completed in 1995
Transport in Shantou